Johann Gockel-Ehrlich (Hans Gockel; ; 8 July 1896 − 11 March 1938) was an Austrian communist. He was an activist in the Austrian and Soviet communist movement, and editor-in-chief of Neuland magazine.

Early life 
Gockel-Ehrlich was born in Salzburg in 1896. His parents ran a paper goods store in Hallein. Gockel-Ehrlich learned bookbinding in Salzburg and Hallein.

Communist 
In 1919, he joined the Communist Party of Austria. Johann founded several Party groups in western Austria. He became chairman of the Communist Party of Austria in Hallein. In 1920, he joined the Communist Party of the Soviet Union. In 1923 Johann emigrated to the Union of Soviet Socialist Republics, where he became the first Austrian student at the Communist University of the National Minorities of the West in Moscow, which he left before the end of the 1923 one-year course. Haeckel-Erlich then moved to Kharkiv. There he began to work as an editor in the German department of the central publishing house. In Kharkiv in 1926, John became editor-in-chief of the atheistic magazine Neuland. This magazine was published in German and provided communist and atheist propaganda among the German-speaking population of the USSR. Living there he received a new name, Gans Gansovich Gokkel (Ганс Гансович Гоккель). He signed his writings in the USSR as Hans Gockel, publishing several books. Hans was arrested on 10 December 1933 for participating in the German counter-revolutionary organization, which set out to overthrow the Soviet regime by force of arms. In his house, two revolvers were discovered during a search. He was convicted under Article 54 of the Criminal Code of the Ukrainian SSR and incriminated by his relationship with the German consulate and Hitler’s agitation. By the decision of the NKVD troika under the college of the GPU of the Ukrainian SSR of 29 May 1934, he was imprisoned for 10 years in labour camp. Gockel served his sentence in Ukhtpechlag. In the camp, he was a senior rationing officer for the 9th detachment of railway construction. While in the camp, he was restrained on 19 December 1937 and sentenced on 5 January 1938 by the “troika” under the administration of the NKVD of the Arkhangelsk Oblast under articles 58–10, 58-11 of the Criminal Code of the RSFSR to capital punishment. The verdict was executed on 11 March 1938. In 1937, his wife tried in vain to persuade the Austrian Legation to intervene in favor of her husband. He was rehabilitated on 26 September  1959.

Works
 Gockel H. ... Was wollen die Gottlosen? / H. Gockel. - Харків : Zentralrat des Verbandes der kämpfenden Gottlosen der Ukraine (Deutsche Sektion), 1929. - 29 с. ; 15 см ;
 Gockel H. ... Dem kommenden Krieg entgegen / Hans Gockel. - Moskau ; Charkow ; Pokrowsk: Zentralverlag, Allukrainisches Abteilung, 1931. - 84 S. ;
 Gockel H. ... Wilde Tiere / Zeichnungen A. Pestun-Dibrowsky; Text H. Gockel. - Charkow : Zentralverlag, [19??]. - 12 с. : ил. ; 13×13 см. - (Kinderfreude ; No. 2);
 Gockel H. ... Entstehung der Erde und Naturerscheinungen : Zum Gebrauch in den Dorfzirkeln der Verbände der Atheisten im deutschen Dorfe und für Selbstbildungszwecke / Zusgef. von H. Gockel. - Charkow : Zentral-Verlag der Völker der Union der SSR, Allukrainische Abteilung, 1928. - 30 с. : ил. ; 22 см. - (Antireligiöse Bibliothek / Allukrainischer Rat der Verbände der Atheisten ; H. 3). - Библиография: с. 29:
 Gockel H. Antireligiöse Bibliothek / Allukrainischer Rat der Verbände der Atheisten. H. 4: , Die Entstehung des Lebens und der Menschen. - 1928
 Gockel H. ... Gott und der Organismus des Menschen : Zum Gebrauche in den Dorfzirkeln der Verbände der Atheisten im deutschen Dorfe und für Selbstbildungszwecke / Zusgef. von H. Gockel. - Charkow : Zentralverlag der Völker der U. der S.S.R., Allukrainische Abteilung, 1928. - 40 с. : ил. ; 22 см. - (Antireligiöse Bibliothek / Allukrainischer Rat der Verbände der Atheisten ; H. 5). - Библиография: с. 39;
 Gockel H. ... Wie entstand der Glaube? : Zum Gebrauche in den Dorfzirkeln der Verbände der Atheisten im deutschen Dorfe und für Selbstbildungszwecke / Zusgef. von H. Gockel. - Charkow : Zentralverlag der Völker der U. der S.S.R., Allukrainische Abteilung, 1928. - 42, [2] с. : ил. ; 22 см. - (Antireligiöse Bibliothek / Allukrainischer Rat der Verbände der Atheisten ; H. 7). - Библиография: с. [1];
 Gockel H. ... Der christliche und der nichtchristliche Glaube : Zum Gebrauche in den Dorfzirkeln der Verbände der Atheisten im deutschen Dorfe und für Selbstbildungszwecke / Zusgef. von H. Gockel. - Charkow : Zentralverlag der Völker der U. der S.S.R., Allukrainische Abteilung, 1928. - 46, [1] с. : ил. ; 22 см. - (Antireligiöse Bibliothek / Allukrainischer Rat der Verbände der Atheisten ; H. 8). - Библиография: с. 46;
 Gockel H. ... Die Entstehung des Christentums (lebte Christus?) : Zum Gebrauche in den Dorfzirkeln der Verbände der Atheisten im deutschen Dorfe und für Selbstbildungszwecke / Zusgef. von H. Gockel. - Charkow : Zentralverlag der Völker der U. der S.S.R., Allukrainische Abteilung, 1929. - 50 с. : ил. ; 22 см. - (Antireligiöse Bibliothek / Allukrainischer Rat der Verbände der Atheisten ; H. 9). - Библиография: с. 49:
 Gockel H. Die katholische Kirche und der katholische Glaube : Zum Gebrauche in den Dorfzirkeln der Verbände der Gottlosen im deutschen Dorfe und für Selbstbildungszwecke / Zusgef. von H. Gockel. - Charkow : Zentralverlag der Völker der U. der S.S.R., Allukrainische Abteilung, 1929. - 82, [1] с. : ил. ; 22 см. - (Antireligiöse Bibliothek / Allukrainischer Rat der Verbände der Atheisten ; H. 12). - Библиография: с. 82</ref>
 Gockel H. ... Wilde Tiere / Zeichnungen A. Pestun-Dibrowsky; Text H. Gockel. - Charkow : Zentralverlag, [19??]. - 12 с. : ил. ; 13×13 см. - (Kinderfreude ; No. 2)
 Gockel H. ... Wie die Leute reisen / Zeichnungen G. Din; Text H. Gockel. - Charkow : Zentralverlag, [19??]. - 19 с. : ил. ; 10×13 см. - (Kinderfreude ; No. 4)
 Gockel H. ... Kulturrevolution / Hans Gockel. - Moskau ; Charkow ; Pokrowsk: Zentralverlag, Allukr. Abteil., s. a. - 80 S. ; 19 см.
 Gockel H. ... Dem kommenden Krieg entgegen / Hans Gockel. - Moskau ; Charkow ; Pokrowsk: Zentralverlag, Allukrainisches Abteilung, 1931. - 84 S. ; 19 см.

References

Notes

 "DAS NEULAND" , antireligiöse Zeitschrift in deutscher Sprache.
 Влада і церква в Україні (перша половина ХХ століття). / Збірник наукових праць. / Укр. асоціація релігієзн.; / Ін-ту філософії ім. Г. С. Сковороди ; / Ред. кол. Пащенко В.О. та ін. / Полтава / 2000 / 135 с. / Стр. 117 / 
 Кравченко, П.; Сітарчук, Р. Протестантські об'єднання в Україні у контексті соціальної політики більшовиків 20-30-і роки ХХ століття. / Издательство: Полтава: АСМІ; 212 страниц; 2005 / Стр. 181
 Neuland : antireligiöse Zweiwochenschrift der deutschen Werktätigen.

Politicians from Salzburg
Communist Party of Austria politicians
Communist Party of the Soviet Union members
Members of the Communist Party of the Soviet Union executed by the Soviet Union
People executed by the Soviet Union by firearm
Executed Russian people
Soviet rehabilitations
20th-century German writers
Christ myth theory proponents
German atheists
Soviet atheists
Russian atheism activists
1896 births
1938 deaths